Cartoonito is a brand name used by Warner Bros. Discovery for a collection of television networks and programming blocks aimed at preschool children. The name combines the "cartoon" with the Spanish suffix "ito", meaning "small".

As of March 2023, Cartoonito-branded channels exist in the United Kingdom and Ireland (its original flagship service), Italy, Latin America, and Central and Eastern Europe, while branded blocks currently air on Cartoon Network in the United Kingdom, Ireland, the Middle East, Turkey, the United States, Japan, Philippines, Taiwan, South Korea, and Oceania. It's sister channel Boomerang has also aired blocks in the Nordics, Portugal, Africa, South Asia, Southeast Asia, and Turkey.

Background

Precursors (1996–2006)

Educational blocks (1996–2005) 
In 1996, Cartoon Network decided to create a Sunday morning block of preschool programs. The series featured Big Bag, a live-action/puppet television program made by the Children's Television Workshop (known for Sesame Street), Small World, a children's animated anthology show/variety show, and Cave Kids (a Hanna-Barbera-produced cartoon spin-off starring Pebbles and Bamm-Bamm).

Small World aired in several countries (except Japan, China, and Korea) and syndicated many of their respective shows. Cave Kids only ran from September to November of that year. However, Big Bag ran until 1998, while Small World ran until c. 2002 before HBO's deal with Sesame Workshop.

In 1997 (just the year after the merger of Turner Broadcasting System with Time Warner), Warner Bros. Animation announced Baby Looney Tunes, an original preschool series inspired by a line of pre-existing merchandise and had finished production by January 2001 with its pilot aired on 3 June of that year. Once the pilot proved a success, work on Baby Looney Tunes resumed, and it premiered on the Kids' WB block 28 July 2001. However, the series officially ran on Cartoon Network from 2002 to 2005, while continuing its original run international until 16 October 2006.

Tiny TV (2003–2006) 

In 2003, Cartoon Network's Indian counterpart introduced Tiny TV, a weekday morning block of acquired preschool cartoons such as Bob the Builder, Kipper, Noddy, and Oswald. By 2006, it had expanded to Cartoon Network and Boomerang channels in Australia, Southeast Asia, and Latin America. Each block carried its own lineup of programs, with only a few shared between feeds. Tiny TV was discontinued internationally in 2007, but was temporarily revived on POGO (a sister channel to Cartoon Network India) in 2010.

Tickle-U (2005–2006) 
Tickle-U was Cartoon Network's first attempt at an official weekday-morning preschool programming block, premiering on August 22, 2005, and aired from 9 to 11 a.m. ET/PT. Programs on the line-up included acquired shows such as two Teletoon/Treehouse TV series, with one being a co-production (Harry and His Bucket Full of Dinosaurs and Gerald McBoing-Boing), and British shows (Gordon the Garden Gnome, Peppa Pig, Little Robots, and Yoko! Jakamoko! Toto!). Unlike their original counterparts, the British-acquired shows featured an American voice cast. The only original series was Firehouse Tales, produced by Warner Bros. Animation.

It featured domestic and foreign-imported series targeted at preschool-age children like its competitors Nick Jr. (on Nickelodeon) and Playhouse Disney (now Disney Junior on Disney Channel). The hosts were two animated CGI characters: a red butterfly-like creature named Pipoca (voiced by Ariel Winter) and a yellow rabbit-like creature named Henderson (voiced by Tom Kenny).

The block came under fire by the CCFC, which criticized its marketing strategies. After Tickle-U closed on January 13, 2006, some of its programmings still aired on Cartoon Network until 2007 and as part of the schedule of the British variation of Cartoonito. The promos for the shows featured on the block had Tickle-U branding and the mascots of the block were all replaced by shots of the main view of the City of Townsville from The Powerpuff Girls (which was taken from Cartoon Network's on-air presentation from 2004–2007). It was the last attempt at a preschool programming block until Cartoonito in 2021 on both Cartoon Network and HBO Max.

History

Launch (2006–2011) 

On 4 September 2006, Cartoon Network Too debuted a new programming block called Cartoonito, running from 6:00 a.m. to 3:00 p.m. daily. The series featured in Cartoonito was acquired from countries worldwide and was available in both English and French. The block was later spun off into a separate channel on 24 May 2007, as Cartoonito expanded its broadcast hours by taking the whole daytime slot formerly given to Cartoon Network Too. In turn, Cartoon Network Too became a 24-hour channel replacing Toonami UK's former channel space. From September 2009 to March 2010, a morning Cartoonito block aired on Boomerang until its launch on Virgin Media.

Brand rollout (2011–2021) 

In May 2011, Turner Broadcasting System EMEA announced a rollout of the Cartoonito brand across Europe, the Middle East, and Africa; under the arrangement, programming blocks would launch on Cartoon Network or Boomerang channels in that region.

Cartoonito launched as a morning block on Cartoon Network Arabic in the Middle East on 4 September 2011, broadcasting seven days a week. Simultaneously, Cartoonito was also available in English in the Middle East via another morning block on the pan-European feed of Boomerang. Both blocks ended on 1 January 2014 (Boomerang) and on 1 April 2014 (Cartoon Network), but the Arabic Cartoon Network would reintroduce Cartoonito on 24 March 2019, now airing Sunday through Thursdays at 9:30 KSA Local Time.

In Italy, Cartoonito was launched as a 24-hour channel on 22 August 2011. In Spain, Cartoonito was launched as a 24-hour channel on 1 September 2011 replacing the Spanish version of Boomerang, as part of Turner Broadcasting System EMEA plans to roll out the brand across Europe, the Middle East and Africa. The move also increased Cartoonito's distribution to 125 million homes in 112 territories. On 30 June 2013, the channel was shut down alongside the Spanish feed of Cartoon Network.

In France, Cartoonito was launched as a block on Boing on 5 September 2011. With low audiences and a reduction of its airtime in September 2012, it eventually retired from Boing on 5 July 2013.

On 1 December 2012, Cartoonito launched in the Asia Pacific and the Philippines through SkyCable. Cartoonito is available as part of its Metropack and on an a la carte basis via Skycable Select. Cartoonito was replaced by Boomerang on 1 January 2015.

On 15 January 2018, Cartoonito UK relaunched as a 24-hour channel.

Global re-introduction and rebrand (2021–present) 
After the announcement of Batwheels on 6 October 2020, Warner Bros. Global Kids, Young Adults and Classics president Tom Ascheim implied about plans for Cartoon Network to attract a preschool audience. On February 5, 2021, Tom Ascheim, president of Warner Bros. Global Kids, Young Adults and Classics announced in an interview with Kidscreen that Cartoon Network would expand its offerings to include series aimed at family audiences, girls, and preschoolers. The latter audience would pit the network in competition with established preschool brands like Disney Junior, PBS Kids and Nick Jr. He would also announced the acquisition of the broadcast rights to the Thomas & Friends reboot series, Thomas & Friends: All Engines Go.

United States 

On February 17, it was announced that WarnerMedia's international preschool brand Cartoonito would launch in the United States on Cartoon Network and streaming service HBO Max. Over 20 series were expected to be featured at its 2021 launch. A website for the block was launched in March 2021. Partnerships also encompassed acquired broadcasting rights to Thomas & Friends: All Engines Go, a reboot of the original Thomas & Friends series. The block officially launched on 13 September 2021, and initially ran for 8 hours (6:00 a.m. to 2:00 p.m. ET/PT) on weekdays and 2 hours (6:00 a.m. to 8:00 a.m. ET/PT) on weekends. It ultimately settled with 4–5 hours only on weekdays (starting at 7:00 a.m. ET/PT).

Latin America 

In October 2021, Sky Brasil announced that Cartoonito would be launching in Brazil on 1 December 2021, replacing Boomerang. A few days later, the Argentine pay television service Telered announced the replacement of Boomerang to Cartoonito for the rest of Latin America on the same date.

EMEA (Europe, Middle East, and Africa) 
In May 2021, WarnerMedia UK and EMEA announced plans to relaunch Cartoonito within their region.

Rebrand in the UK And Ireland 
On 1 February 2022, the British and Irish Cartoonito channel adopted the worldwide rebrand. Additionally, starting on 1 March 2022, a weekday hour-long Cartoonito block aired from 9:00 a.m. to 10:00 a.m. on sister channel Cartoon Network. The block now runs from 9:00 a.m. to 11:00 a.m. on weekdays and does not air during the school holidays.

Rebrand in Italy 
On 5 June 2022, the Italian Cartoonito channel adopted the worldwide rebrand, officially retiring the old mascots along the way, making it one of the last Cartoonito-branded channels to retire Cartoonito's original CGI mascots, The Cartoonitos.

Other EMEA Regions 
In the Nordics, Cartoonito launched as a programming block on Boomerang on 1 February 2022.

On 6 February 2022, Cartoonito MENA rebranded with a new look alongside. It's currently unconfirmed it this will expand across its sister service alongside Cartoon Network Africa.

Beginning on 7 February 2022, the Cartoonito blocks on Cartoon Network Arabic and Cartoon Network Turkey adopted the rebrand.

In Portugal, a morning and afternoon Cartoonito block launched on Boomerang on 21 February 2022. The channel will fully rebrand as Cartoonito on 23 March 2023.

In Africa, Boomerang relaunched its morning Cartoonito block on 4 April 2022. On 8 February 2023, it was announced that Cartoonito would expand into a full-time channel in Boomerang's place on 25 March.

In Central and Eastern Europe, Germany, and the Netherlands, Boomerang relaunched its morning Cartoonito block on 1 September 2022. In January 2023, it was announced that Boomerang CEE would be fully replaced with a standalone Cartoonito channel on 18 March 2023.

In France, Boing will be replaced by a Cartoonito channel on 3 April 2023.

APAC (Asia-Pacific) 
In Japan, the Cartoonito block was launched on 1 March 2022 on Cartoon Network for daily mornings.

In Southeast Asia, Hong Kong, Taiwan and Korea, Cartoonito relaunched as a programming block on 28 March 2022 on Cartoon Network. It offers a modern approach to preschool programming, built to support each child’s unique potential with its educational framework called "Humancentric Learning".

In Australia and New Zealand, a Cartoonito block launched on 27 June 2022 on Cartoon Network. A dedicated Cartoonito pop-up channel was available on Australia's Foxtel from 10 March 2023.

On 2 May 2022, an additional Cartoonito block debuted on Boomerang Asia. Later, on 21 November, Cartoon Network discontinued its Cartoonito block, with the brand fully shifting to Boomerang. Cartoonito continues to air on Cartoon Network Philippines.

Mascots

The Cartoonitos (2006–2022) 
From its initial launch, Cartoonito's original six CGI mascots included Cuba (a red cube), Lolly (a purple cylinder), Ringo (a green ring), Spike (a blue pyramid), Ting (a pink star), and Bubble (a yellow sphere). They were called The Cartoonitos. Maria Darling voiced Cuba, Lolly, and Ringo, while Shelley Longworth voiced Spike, Ting, and Bubble in the UK. Initially, in the UK, Bubble, Spike and Ting spoke French and taught French phrases to viewers.

The mascots were retired in the UK in February 2022, and later in Italy in June 2022, as they adopted the rebranding.

Rebrand (2021–present) 
As part of Cartoonito's global reintroduction, the original CGI mascots were retired in favor of four 2D-animated ones. The new mascots are Nito (a cyan square), Glob (a multi-colored glob-like figure), Wedge (a magenta triangle), and Itty (a pink circle).

These characters were exclusive to the US and Latin American feeds in 2021, until the British and Italian feeds adopted them in 2022.

See also 

 Cartoon Network (international channels)
 Cartoonito (international channels)
 Boomerang
 Tiny TV – former international brand block for Turner Europe.

References

External links 

  (International)
  (United States)
  (United Kingdom)
  (Italy)
  (Latin America)
  (Brazil)
  (Mexico)
  (Argentina)
  (Asia)
  (Africa)

Cartoonito
Cartoon Network
Boomerang (TV network)
Cartoon Network programming blocks
Children's television networks
Children's television channels in the United Kingdom
Children's television networks in the United States
Preschool education television networks
Television channels and stations established in 2006
Warner Bros. Discovery brands
Warner Bros. Discovery networks